Teretianax baculumpastoris is a species of sea snail, a marine gastropod mollusk in the family Eulimidae.

Distribution
This marine species occurs off the Loyalty Islands.

References

 Melvill, J.C. & Standen, R. (1896). Notes on a collection of shells from Lifu and Uvea, Loyalty Islands, formed by the Rev. James and Mrs. Hadfield, with list of species. Part II. Journal of Conchology. 8(9): 273-315

External links
 To World Register of Marine Species
 Melvill, J.C. & Standen, R. (1896). Notes on a collection of shells from Lifu and Uvea, Loyalty Islands, formed by the Rev. James and Mrs. Hadfield, with list of species. Part II. Journal of Conchology. 8(9): 273-315

Eulimidae
Gastropods described in 1896